Siza Selby Dlamini (born 2 April 1976) is a Liswati retired footballer who played as a striker. He has been capped for Eswatini. He was also named a top 10 COSAFA Cup Legend.

He served as an assistant coach for Jomo Cosmos after his retirement.

Clubs
1994–1999 :  Mbabane Swallows
1999–2001 :  Bush Bucks
2001–2004 :  Lamontville Golden Arrows
2004–2006 :  Durban Stars
2006–2007 :  FC AK
2007–2011 :  Jomo Cosmos

References

External links

1976 births
Living people
Swazi footballers
Eswatini international footballers
Association football forwards
Mbabane Swallows players
Bush Bucks F.C. players
Lamontville Golden Arrows F.C. players
Durban Stars F.C. players
F.C. AK players
Jomo Cosmos F.C. players
South African Premier Division players
National First Division players
Swazi expatriate footballers
Swazi expatriate sportspeople in South Africa
Expatriate soccer players in South Africa